Golden Boys or The Golden Boys may refer to:

 Golden Boys (band), a Brazilian rock group founded in 1958
 Golden Boys (novel), a 2014 novel by Sonya Hartnett
 The Golden Boys, a 2009 American romantic comedy film
 Boulton, Watt and Murdoch, a statue of Matthew Boulton, James Watt, and William Murdoch in Birmingham, England, nicknamed The Golden Boys
 Watford F.C., Watford Football Club, nicknamed "The Golden Boys"
 Golden Boys, a touring act comprising Frankie Avalon, Bobby Rydell, and Fabian Forte
 "Golden Boys", a 2001 song by Res from How I Do

See also
Golden Boy (disambiguation)